The Master of Lourinhã was a Portuguese painter of religious scenes active between 1510 and 1525.  He might have been of North Netherlandish origin.
He has been named after the church Santa Casa da Misericórdia in Lourinhã, Lisbon District, where two of his paintings are exhibited.

References

16th-century Flemish painters
16th-century Portuguese painters
Lourinha, Master of
Year of birth missing
Year of death missing
Portuguese people of Dutch descent